66P/du Toit is a periodic comet in the Solar System with a current orbital period of 14.78 years. It came to perihelion on 2018 May 19 at roughly apparent magnitude 12.

It was discovered by Daniel du Toit at the Boyden Observatory, South Africa on 16 May 1944, who estimated its brightness at magnitude 10. Other observers estimated magnitude 11 and 12.5. Its next return date was calculated to have a perihelion date of 10 April 1959 but it was not discovered.

The 1974 return was found almost accidentally with a perihelion date of 1 April 1974 and a brightness of magnitude 18-19. The 1989 appearance was again missed. The 2003 appearance had a perihelion date of 27 August 2003 and a brightness of magnitude 20.

See also
List of numbered comets

References
 

Periodic comets
0066
066P
Comets in 2018
19440516